Margaret is a 2009 television film produced by Great Meadow Productions for the BBC. It was first broadcast on 26 February 2009 on BBC Two. It was made by the same production company as the 2008 television film The Long Walk to Finchley, which fictionalised the start of Thatcher's political career.

Plot
Margaret is a fictionalisation of the life of Margaret Thatcher (played by Lindsay Duncan) and her fall from the premiership in the 1990 leadership election, with flashbacks telling the story of Thatcher's defeat of Edward Heath in the 1975 leadership election.

Production
On 9 April 2008, it was announced that Duncan was to play Thatcher, and filming commenced in summer 2008.

Cast

 Lindsay Duncan - Margaret Thatcher, Prime Minister
 Ian McDiarmid - Denis Thatcher, Prime Minister's Spouse
 Robert Hardy - Willie Whitelaw, Former Deputy Prime Minister and Home Secretary
 James Fox - Charles Powell, Prime Minister's Foreign Policy Advisor and Private Secretary
 Rupert Vansittart - Peter Morrison, Prime Minister's Parliamentary Private Secretary
 Alan Cox - Gordon Reece, Prime Minister's Media Advisor
 Christian McKay - John Whittingdale, Prime Minister's Political Secretary
Oliver Le Sueur - Mark Thatcher, Prime Minister's Son
 Olivia Poulet - Carol Thatcher, Prime Minister's Daughter
 Kevin McNally - Kenneth Clarke, Education Secretary
 Roy Marsden - Norman Tebbit, former cabinet minister
 Nicholas Rowe - Malcolm Rifkind, Scotland Secretary
 Michael Maloney - John Major, Chancellor of the Exchequer
 Roger Allam - John Wakeham, Energy Secretary (Allam would go on to have a role in The Iron Lady, a big screen portrayal of Thatcher's terms in office)
 Nicholas Jones - Tim Renton, Chief Whip (Jones is also in The Iron Lady, as Admiral Henry Leach)
 Tim McMullan - William Waldegrave, Foreign Office Minister
 Nicholas Le Provost - Douglas Hurd, Foreign Secretary
 Michael Cochrane - Alan Clark, Defence Minister and Thatcher Supporter (Cochrane would also go on to have a role in The Iron Lady)

 John Sessions - Geoffrey Howe, Deputy Prime Minister and Leader of the House of Commons (Sessions would also go on to have a role in The Iron Lady)
 Philip Jackson - Bernard Ingham, Prime Minister's Press Secretary
 Roger Ashton-Griffiths - John Sergeant, ITV Reporter
 Oliver Cotton - Michael Heseltine, Former Defence Secretary
 Guy Henry - Tristan Garel Jones, Government Whip
 Diana Kent - Margaret King
 Elizabeth Bennett - Sue Mastriforte
 Julian Firth - Norman Lamont, Chief Secretary to the Treasury
 Rosemary Leach - Queen Elizabeth II
Douglas McFerran - MP2
Nigel Le Vaillant - Edward Heath, Former Conservative Leader and Prime Minister
 Dermot Crowley - Airey Neave, Thatcher Campaign Manager in 1975
Ian Hughes - John Gummer
 Nicholas Day - Cranley Onslow
 Paul Jesson - Kenneth Baker
Charlotte Asprey - Caroline Stephens, Thatcher's secretary, wife of Lord Ryder of Wensum
Jenny Howe - Cynthia Crawford
Tim Wallers - MP1
Martin Chamberlain - Nigel Lawson
 Mark Perry - John MacGregor
George Pensotti - Speaker of the House of Commons
Francis Maguire - Official

Hardy, Fox, Vansittart and Cochrane had all appeared in the 2002 TV production of The Falklands Play, by Ian Curteis, about an earlier period in Thatcher's premiership; although many political figures were featured in both films, none of the four actors played the same roles in both.

Allam, Cochrane, Jones and Sessions would go on to appear in the 2011 film The Iron Lady about Thatcher's rise to power, relationship with her husband, and life after politics.

Reception
The Guardian critic praised the "deft casting" and stated that the flashbacks were "illuminating and sometimes entertaining" and that some episodes in the drama were "wholly imaginary and thoroughly un-Thatcherite, but ... [hang] around the mind like cigar smoke".

Media releases
It is currently available for purchase in the UK.

See also
 Thatcher: The Final Days, a 1991 film also depicting the final days of Thatcher's premiership
 Cultural depictions of Margaret Thatcher

References

External links

2009 in British politics
2009 in British television
2009 television films
2009 films
BBC television docudramas
British television films
Films about Margaret Thatcher
Films set in 1975
Films set in 1979
Films set in 1990
Films set in London
Political history of the United Kingdom
Films about elections
Films directed by James Kent (director)
2000s British films